Schmollensee is a lake in Usedom, Mecklenburg-Vorpommern, Germany. At an elevation of 0 m, its surface area is 5.03 km².

External links 

 

Lakes of Mecklenburg-Western Pomerania